|}

The Beresford Stakes is a Group 2 flat horse race in Ireland open to two-year-old thoroughbreds. It is run at the Curragh over a distance of 1 mile (1,609 metres), and it is scheduled to take place each year in September or October.

History
The event was sponsored by Panasonic in the mid-1980s, and during this time it held Group 2 status. Juddmonte Farms took over the sponsorship in 1988. Its most illustrious winner was Nijinsky in 1969.

The race was relegated to Group 3 level in 1992. It regained Group 2 status in 2003.

The Beresford Stakes was added to the Breeders' Cup Challenge series in 2012. The winner earned an invitation to compete in the Breeders' Cup Juvenile Turf. It was dropped from the series in 2013. Since 2017 the Beresford Stakes has been part of the Road to the Kentucky Derby.

Records
Leading jockey since 1950 (6 wins):
 Liam Ward – Kildoon (1953), Carezza (1955), Scissors (1963), Hibernian (1967), Nijinsky (1969), Minsky (1970)

Leading trainer since 1950 (21 wins):
 Aidan O'Brien - Johan Cruyff (1996), Saratoga Springs (1997), Festival Hall (1998), Lermontov (1999), Turnberry Isle (2000), Castle Gandolfo (2001), Albert Hall (2004), Septimus (2005), Eagle Mountain (2006), St Nicholas Abbey (2009), David Livingston (2011), Battle of Marengo (2012), Geoffrey Chaucer (2013), Ol' Man River (2014), Port Douglas (2015), Capri (2016), Saxon Warrior (2017), Japan (2018), Innisfree (2019), High Definition (2020), Luxembourg (2021)

Winners since 1977

Earlier winners

 1875: Richelieu
 1880: Barcaldine
 1891: Wordsworth
 1910: Cheery Pat
 1917: Judea
 1919: Royal Ashe
 1920: Ballyheron
 1930: Spiral
 1943: Arctic Sun
 1945: Linaria
 1946: Grand Weather
 1949: Dark Warrior
 1950: Setello
 1951: Grand Morning
 1952: Northern Gleam
 1953: Kildoon
 1954: Arctic Time
 1955: Carezza
 1956: Viviptic
 1957: Articeelagh
 1958: Sunny Court
 1959: Lynchris
 1960: Paris Princess
 1961: Richmond
 1962: Pontifex
 1963: Scissors
 1964: Jealous
 1965: Boleslas
 1966: Sovereign Slipper
 1967: Hibernian
 1968: Deep Run
 1969: Nijinsky
 1970: Minsky
 1971: Boucher
 1972: Chamozzle
 1973: Saritamer
 1974: Mark Anthony
 1975: Whistling Deer
 1976: Orchestra

See also
 Horse racing in Ireland
 List of Irish flat horse races

References

 Paris-Turf:
 Racing Post:

 galopp-sieger.de – Beresford Stakes.
 horseracingintfed.com – International Federation of Horseracing Authorities – Beresford Stakes (2018).
 irishracinggreats.com – Beresford Stakes (Group 2).
 pedigreequery.com – Beresford Stakes – Curragh.

Flat races in Ireland
Curragh Racecourse
Flat horse races for two-year-olds